The Memorial of the Victims of Communism and of the Resistance in Romania consists of the Sighet Museum (often confused with the Memorial), located in the city of Sighetu Marmației, Maramureș County, and the International Centre for Studies into Communism, located in Bucharest.

International Centre for Studies into Communism
Created and administered by the Civic Academy Foundation, it is an institute of research, museography and education.

Sighet Memorial Museum
The museum was created by the Centre for Studies into Communism out of the ruins of the former Sighet Prison in 1993.

The restoration of the prison building was completed in 2000. Each prison cell became a museum room, which together presented the chronology of the totalitarian system in Communist Romania.

References

Socialist Republic of Romania
Research institutes in Romania
Education in Romania
Organizations established in 1993
Memorials to victims of communism
Buildings and structures in Maramureș County
History museums in Romania
Tourist attractions in Maramureș County
Prison museums in Europe
Sighetu Marmației
1993 establishments in Romania